"Because" is a song recorded by English rock band The Dave Clark Five from their third studio album American Tour (1964). Written by Dave Clark and singer Mike Smith, and produced by Adrian Clark, the song was originally the B-side to "Can't You See That She's Mine" in the UK.

"Because" was released as a single in the United States and reached number three on the US Billboard Hot 100 chart. It also charted at number three in both Canada and New Zealand. Julian Lennon released a version of the song which peaked at number 40 on the UK Singles Chart in 1985.

Background and release

"Because" was written with the intention of being the Dave Clark Five's fifth US single, but the band's label, Epic Records, was initially resistant, believing the ballad strayed too far from the hit-making formula that had proven successful with the band's previous upbeat singles. 
In May 1964, the song was released in the UK as the B-side to "Can't You See That She's Mine". Clark insisted that "Because" be released as an A-side in the US, and Epic eventually agreed. 
The single entered the Billboard Hot 100 chart at number sixty in August, and peaked six weeks later at number three. 
"Because" became the band's fifth US single to sell more than one million copies. 
In Canada, the song reached number three on RPM magazine's singles chart.

The songwriting credits on the record are given to Dave Clark and Mike Smith, but "Because" is one of several Dave Clark Five songs claimed to have been co-written by Ron Ryan, rather than by Clark.

Critical reception
 In a review for the single, Billboard described "Because" as a "warmly romantic ballad ... that should keep [The Dave Clark Five] on the chart."
Cash Box described it as "a most attractive shuffle rock-a-cha-cha beat newcomer...that the artists wax in ear-arresting manner."
 Richie Unterberger of AllMusic said the song "was on about the same melodic level as all but the best of the early Beatles' compositions". He felt the song showed a more subtle side of the band, contrasting it with the "stomping hits that were their main diet." Unterberger also complimented the track's harmony vocals, and noted the "beautiful, unusual, and irresistible chord changes" as well as the "tender, romantic lyrics".

Other versions
 The Supremes recorded a version of "Because" on the group's A Bit of Liverpool (1964), a tribute album dedicated to music of the British Invasion. 
 The Ray Conniff Environment released the song as a single in 1972.
 Julian Lennon recorded the song for the soundtrack to Dave Clark's musical Time (1986). Released as a single in 1985, Lennon's version reached number 40 on the UK Singles Chart, and number eight on the Belgium Singles Chart.
Indie recording artist Michael Poss included a version of "Because" on his debut CD I Can Feel You In My Heart (1996), citing Dave Clark as Poss' inspiration to write Pop songs.
 One-man band act Arthur Nakane performed his own rendition of the song in his audition for the fifth season of America's Got Talent. He dedicated his performance to judge Sharon Osbourne.

Track listing

7" Single (US, Canada)

Chart performance

Weekly charts

Year-end charts

References

External links
 

1964 singles
The Dave Clark Five songs
The Supremes songs
Julian Lennon songs
Columbia Graphophone Company singles
Capitol Records singles
Epic Records singles
1964 songs
Songs written by Dave Clark (musician)